Fairlife, stylized as fa!rlife, is an American brand of ultra-filtered milk distributed in Canada, China and the United States by The Coca-Cola Company. In the United States, the milk comes in five flavors: reduced fat, chocolate, strawberry, fat-free, and whole milk.

Fairlife LLC is wholly owned by The Coca-Cola Company. The Coca-Cola Company initially owned a 42.5% stake in Fairlife LLC, and acquired the remaining 57.5% equity stake in January 2020. Fairlife is headquartered in Chicago, Illinois, rather than in Coca-Cola's main headquarters in Atlanta, Georgia.

History
In 2012, Fairlife, LLC was formed when Select Milk Producers entered into a partnership with The Coca-Cola Company. The brand first appeared in Minnesota, where it launched in February 2014.

In November 2014, an advertising campaign for the brand featuring pin-up girls covered in milk, with the taglines on the ads claiming the milk contained "50% more protein & calcium," was launched in the brand's Minneapolis and Denver test markets. Business Insider reported that some Twitter users criticized the advertisements. Laura Bates of The Guardian criticized the ads, claiming they sexualized women for commercial purposes and noting, "seeing these images of women’s bodies being used, once again, to advertise an unrelated consumer product ('Drink what she’s wearing') is a tedious reminder that when it comes to the objectification of women in advertising, we seem to be slipping backward instead of moving forward." Chris Plante of The Verge commented, "at worst the ad is selling consumers on the idea of drinking ultra-filtered milk off an ultra-sexualized woman, and at worst it's selling you 2% part milk. The remaining Fairlife ads are equal parts awkward and demeaning." Plante, however, adds,"otherwise Fairlife has honed its pitch as a healthy, natural dairy product," mentioning the brand's marketing sheet.

Later, in February 2015, the Coca-Cola Company officially launched Fairlife, and began to distribute the milk across the United States. Fairlife is marketed as an ultra-filtered milk, as well as "a dairy option that is sourced from sustainable family farms."

In November 2015, Fairlife added its fa!rlife YUP! brand to its lineup, which was marketed to "tweens" and young adults. It currently comes in four all-natural flavors, including Rich Chocolate, Smooth Vanilla, Very Strawberry and Dairy ‘Licious. It's marketed as having 25% less sugar "compared to regular low-fat chocolate milk".

In January 2020, the company added a range of coffee creamers to its lineup with four flavor options: regular, Hazelnut, Vanilla and Caramel. Later, in July 2020, Fairlife added ice cream to its lineup, with seven flavor options: vanilla, chocolate, cookies & cream, chocolate peanut butter, double fudge brownie, java chip and mint chip. The brand claims that each flavor will have between eight and nine grams of protein and 40% less sugar than traditional ice cream.

Filtration process
Anders Porter of Fairlife's Coopersville, Michigan, facility stated, "we separate the cream, filter, heat treat, homogenize, test and bottle the milk." According to Sue McCloskey, who developed the system used to make Fairlife with her husband Mike McCloskey, the ultrafiltration process removes the lactose and much of the sugar and leaves behind more of the protein and calcium. Fairlife is labeled as ultra-filtered milk.

Distribution and pricing
The Fairlife line of milk is distributed by Coca-Cola's Minute Maid division.

In regard to Coca-Cola's strategy for Fairlife, the company's North America President Sandy Douglas stated, "Our vision for the nutrition beverage business and the milk product that I showed you which is made on a sustainable dairy with fully sustainable high-care processes with animals, has a proprietary milk filtering process that allows you to increase protein by 50 percent, take sugar down by 30 percent, and have no lactose, and a milk that's premiumised and taste better and we'll charge twice as much for it as the milk we're used to buying in a jug." The cost of Fairlife is indeed, roughly twice as high as conventional milk; Fairlife's national average price in the US is $4.29 per 52 oz., compared to the national average pricing of conventional milk at $2 per 64 oz.

Reception
Following its widespread launch in February 2015, Khushbu Shah of Eater.com wrote that overall reviews of the milk were mixed, although the chocolate variety, in particular, was generally well received.

Dietitians and nutritionists were generally critical of the milk; Alissa Rumsey, a spokesperson for the Academy of Nutrition and Dietetics expressed, "When you really look at the numbers, it can sound appealing, but in general most Americans are already getting enough protein," adding, "If you need more, eat an egg or a handful of almonds. And people who need more calcium should up their intake of dark leafy greens, not the so-called Frankenmilk." Registered dietitian Keri Gans claimed, "milk is already a great package of nutrients; I’m not quite sure why it needs to be changed," and commented on the removal of sugar in Fairlife milk with, "I never looked at the sugar in milk as a problem." Meredith Engel of New York Daily News speculated that, "it’s clear why Coke is trying to get into the milk business: More and more Americans are turning away from sugary soft drinks, and soda sales fell to a 19-year-low in 2013." Men's Health nutrition advisor Mike Roussell, however advised his clients to switch over to Fairlife's milk.

Hayley Peterson of Business Insider wrote, "The chocolate milk was the crowd favorite. It's very sweet, but not overpowering, and the consistency is creamier and thicker than regular milk." Peterson adds that, "most people agreed that the 2% milk tasted similar to whole milk. Many reviewers loved the milky taste, while others thought it was too overpowering." Sam Rega, a Business Insider video producer commented, "Both skim and 2% had an after-taste, but otherwise I couldn't tell much of a difference from this and regular milk."

While Chris Plante of The Verge commented, "to my surprise, Fairlife tastes, well, like milk. It looks and feels a little thicker than traditional milk, and has a slightly richer taste, especially the chocolate milk, which sits on the spectrum between chocolate shake and milk that's stewed on a lazy Saturday morning in a bowl of Cocoa Puffs," he criticized the aftertaste, stating, "Fairlife's aftertaste is less appealing. A few minutes sipping a cup of chocolate Fairlife and then a cup of 2% Fairlife, the inside of my mouth had that malty feel that chases a protein shake." Rachel Sanders of BuzzFeed observed, "Fairlife is a little bit creepy to drink. The texture is much more viscous and thick than regular milk, and the odor is really strong, to the point that it smells almost spoiled. It tastes OK, but has a slightly musky flavor that reminds me of shelf-stable or reconstituted milk."

Controversy
On June 4, 2019, the animal protection organization Animal Recovery Mission (ARM) released a video of an undercover dairy investigation into Fair Oaks Farms in Fair Oaks, Indiana. During the investigation, farm employees were observed slapping, kicking, punching, pushing, throwing and slamming calves; calves were stabbed and beaten with steel rebars, hit in the mouth and face with hard plastic milking bottles, kneed in the spine, burned in the face with hot branding irons. This resulted in extreme pain and suffering by the calves, and in some cases permanent injury and even death. ARM confirmed that male calves from Fair Oaks Farms are in fact transported to veal farms (Midwest Veal and Calf Start), despite the corporation's claims that it does not send its male calves to veal farms. In addition, the ARM investigator captured footage of drug use. The four Fair Oaks Farms employees including the ARM employee were fired a few months before the video was released and at least three retailers including Jewel-Osco announced they would remove all Fairlife products from their shelves.

Indiana state Senator Travis Holdman, who sponsored Indiana's ag-gag bill, claimed that the video was "politically motivated", which ARM vigorously denied and prompted the group to release extended footage. The political controversy deepened as Newton County Prosecutor Jeff Drinski released a statement indicating that the ARM investigator encouraged or coerced the farm employees to abuse the animals. ARM's founder, Richard Couto, rebuked the statement and said that his organization has not been contacted by the prosecutors office, which he says is a red flag given ARM has worked with law enforcement agencies in other abuse investigations. "There is no reason the prosecutor shouldn’t be calling me and/or a witness to be interviewed yet," he said. A binder detailing ARM's investigation along with video footage were provided to the Newton County Sheriff's Office the same day the video was released to the public.

References

External links 
 

Coca-Cola brands
Milk
Products introduced in 2014
2014 establishments in Minnesota